Lois Fine is a Canadian playwright. She is most noted for her play Freda and Jem's Best of the Week, which premiered at Buddies in Bad Times in 2014 and garnered a Lambda Literary Award nomination in the Drama category at the 29th Lambda Literary Awards in 2017.

The play, about a longtime lesbian couple's divorce, was inspired in part by the end of Fine's own relationship with Rachel Epstein.

Her other plays have included Dany's Gift and Body and Soul.

Fine is Jewish.

References

External links
Lois Fine at the Playwrights Guild of Canada

Canadian women dramatists and playwrights
Canadian lesbian writers
Lesbian Jews
Lesbian dramatists and playwrights
Canadian LGBT dramatists and playwrights
Jewish Canadian writers
Living people
21st-century Canadian dramatists and playwrights
21st-century Canadian women writers
Year of birth missing (living people)
21st-century Canadian LGBT people